James Palmer may refer to:

Politicians
James Palmer (British politician, born 1969), former mayor of the Cambridgeshire and Peterborough Combined Authority
James Palmer (1585–1658), member of parliament for Canterbury, Chancellor of the Order of the Garter
Herbert James Palmer (1851–1939), Canadian politician
Sir James Frederick Palmer (1803–1871), Australian politician
James Dampier Palmer (1851–1899), British politician
James George Palmer (1875–1952), American politician
James Bardin Palmer (died 1833), Irish-born land agent, lawyer and politician in Prince Edward Island

Sportspeople
James Palmer Jr. (born 1996), American professional basketball player for the Cleveland Charge
Jim Palmer (born 1945), member of the Baseball Hall of Fame
Jim Palmer (basketball) (1933–2013), American professional basketball player
Jimmy Palmer (footballer) (1877–1947), Australian rules footballer for Geelong
Jamie Palmer (born 1985), British footballer
James Palmer (cyclist) (born 1994), Canadian BMX cyclist

Characters
Jimmy Palmer, NCIS character
James Palmer, character in Goodbye World

Others
James A. Palmer (1825–1896), Irish-American photographer
James Shedden Palmer (1810–1867), American admiral and U.S. Navy officer during the American Civil War
James Palmer (priest) (died 1660), priest and philanthropist
James Palmer (bishop) (1869–1954), British Anglican bishop; Bishop in Bombay

See also
James Palmer-Tomkinson (1915–1952), British skier